Gunnerud is a surname. Notable people with the surname include: 

Arne Vinje Gunnerud (1930-2007), Norwegian sculptor
Jon Arne Gunnerud, Norwegian handball player
Jørgen Gunnerud (born 1948), Norwegian crime fiction writer
Sverre M. Gunnerud (born 1948), Norwegian television presenter